Lucius Passienus Rufus was a Roman senator and a novus homo of some oratorical talent. He was consul in 4 BC as the colleague of Gaius Calvisius Sabinus.

He inherited the name, the wealth, and the influence of his uncle Sallust. Rufus is also the father of Gaius Sallustius Passienus Crispus, who was adopted by Sallustius and who married Augustus' great-granddaughter Agrippina the Younger.

The sortition awarded Passienus Rufus the proconsular governorship of Africa (circa 4/3 BC). While governor he led a successful campaign in the frontier zone, for which he earned the ornamenta.

References 

1st-century BC Roman consuls
Imperial Roman consuls
Roman governors of Africa
Senators of the Roman Empire
Year of birth unknown
Year of death unknown